Hans Georg Aleksandrovitch, Prince Yourievsky (Russian: Ханс-Георг Александрович Юрьевский; born 8 December 1961) is a Swiss businessman and current head of the House of Yourievsky. He is the only surviving great-grandson of Alexander II of Russia. Prince Yourievsky is second (half) cousin once removed of Grand Duchess Maria Vladimirovna of Russia, a second (half) cousin twice removed of Prince Andreas zu Leiningen and a second (half) cousin twice removed of Georg Friedrich, Prince of Prussia.

Life 
Hans Georg is the only child of Alexander Georgievich, Prince Yourievsky (1900-1988) and Swiss Ursula Anne Marie (née Beer von Grüneck; 1925-2001). He was born in St. Gallen but primarily grew-up in Flims in Grisons. The princes family didn't speak Russian at home, which primarily came from the bad stigma during the Cold War. He was raised speaking English with his father and Swiss German to his mother.

After he completed economic grammar school he studied law and business administration (MBA) in Zürich. He then worked for various IT and software companies in executive positions until 2005. Since 2006, he has been primarily active in consulting and real estate development, also in Saint Petersburg in Russia. He currently serves as a board member of Blagomanz AG, the Zug-based holding company, of Ljuba Manz-Lurje. She inherited several hotels from her late husband Caspar E. Manz (namely Hotel St. Gotthard in Zürich).

Private 
In 2003, Prince Yourievsky married the Dutch-born Katharina (née Verhagen; b. 1964), this marriage was divorced in 2012. Subsequently, he married Elikonida Silvia (née Trumpp; b. 1968) on August 30, 2013 at the Russian Orthodox Church in Zürich. He grew-up in both religious, Catholic on his mother's side, Russian-Orthodox on his father's side.

See also 
 House of Yurievsky

References

External links 
 Official Website of the Prince and Princess Yourievsky 
 Japan Times: For czar's great-grandson, Russia needs a strong leader
 SRF Reporter: Der schöne Prinz aus Flims - Hofnachrichten der Zarenfamilie (in German)
 Stuttgarter Zeitung: Urenkel eines Zaren bei 'Anastasia' - Wenn in Stuttgart die russische Seele erwacht (in German)
 Süddeutsche Zeitung: 100 Jahre Oktoberrevolution - Liebesgrüsse nach Moskau

1961 births
Living people